Francisco Blanco may refer to:

 Francisco J. Blanco, Spanish structural biologist 
 Francisco Blanco (martyr) (died 1597), Spanish Roman Catholic Franciscan missionary and martyr
 Francisco Manuel Blanco (1778–1845), Spanish friar and botanist